Sweet Surrender may refer to:

Songs 
 "Sweet Surrender" (John Denver song)
 "Sweet Surrender" (Sarah McLachlan song), 1997
 "Sweet Surrender" (Wet Wet Wet song), 1989
 "Sweet Surrender" (David Gates song), by Bread
 "Sweet Surrender", by Brenda K. Starr from the soundtrack for the film License to Drive
 "Sweet Surrender", by Diana Ross from Why Do Fools Fall in Love
 "Sweet Surrender", by Harry Nilsson from Knnillssonn
 "Sweet Surrender", by Jaci Velasquez from Jaci Velasquez
 "Sweet Surrender", by Richard and Linda Thompson from First Light
 "Sweet Surrender", by Rod Stewart from Body Wishes
 "Sweet Surrender", by Sarah Blasko from Prelusive
 "Sweet Surrender", by Tim Buckley from Greetings from L.A.
 "Sweet Surrender", by Weta from Geographica

Other
 Sweet Surrender, a 1979 album by Anita Ward
 Sweet Surrender (TV series), a 1987 sitcom featuring David Doyle
 Sweet Surrender (film), a 1935 American musical film
 Sweet Surrender (Grey's Anatomy), an episode of Grey's Anatomy